Holland V is a 2003 Singaporean drama series produced by MediaCorp. It stars Chen Liping, Xie Shaoguang, Patricia Mok, Cynthia Koh, Jeanette Aw, Vivian Lai, Pierre Png, Xiang Yun & Mark Lee as the casts of the series. It was the third long-running drama in Singaporean television history, and was modelled on the long running Hong Kong drama A Kindred Spirit. Like A Kindred Spirit, the main family in the series, the Mo family, operates a small restaurant (serving nasi lemak) in Holland Village (also known as Holland V, hence the title).

Originally intended to be 115 episodes long, the series was extended to 125 episodes after strong viewership. Holland V was also well received in the Star Awards 2003 ceremony as it became one of the two dramas to have won every one of four major acting categories (the other was The Dream Makers (season 2) in 2015–16).

Plot
Written by famed Singaporean scriptwriter Ang Eng Tee. Holland V, spanning more than 100 episodes, Holland V, as the title suggests, revolves around the quaint neighbourhood of Holland Village, particularly singling out the Mo Family.

"Big Sister" Mo Wanwan is known not only for her famous nasi lemak, but also for her Herculean strength, huge appetite and rotund build. Yet, she hasn't always looked like that. The hefty-sized Mo used to be a pretty, svelte girl, and had a daughter, Lin Siting, with Lin Jingcai at the age of 18. Jingcai then brought the baby back home to be taken care of by his wife Su Yueping, who is unable to conceive. Ever since Jingcai was put behind bars for a crime he committed, Yueping forbids Wanwan from seeing Siting. The 2 women are always squabbling, and are known as 'the most quarrelsome duo in Holland Village'.

Upset from not being able to see her daughter, Mo turns her misery into eating sprees. Within a decade, she has turned into a boorish 'Iron Lady' whom everyone fears. She is however, forced to look into her weighty issues when she finds herself falling for Fang Nuowen, a doctor.

Mo Wanwan has many siblings: second sister, the deceptively skinny Mo Lingling, possesses a formidable kick when she's provoked. Otherwise, though, Mo Lingling is all demure and kind but sadly, she is often bullied by her colleagues and even her own foul-tempered husband, Tian Dahua.

Third sister, Mo Yanyan, also older twin sister to Mo Jingjing, is a lazybones who holds a record of sleeping continuously for 3 days and nights. A beauty with brains but who's so lazy, she could give up a Varsity exam for sleep! She soon begins to see the harsh reality of the working world but yet dreams of amassing $100m by the age of 30.

Mo Jingjing is the exact opposite of her older twin sister, Mo Yanyan. She is dim-witted, has a low IQ but works very hard at Wanwan's nasi lemak stall. An innocent and kind girl who often gets cheated of her money and love, she nevertheless remained optimistic and bear no grudges against those who had done her wrong. Although her family often berates her for being stupid, Lady Luck is always by her side – she strikes lottery frequently and everyone begs her for lottery numbers.

As a dedicated botanist, Mo Rourou is yet another pair of twins with her younger twin brother, Mo Yangyang, whose life revolves around nothing but plants. Though blessed with good looks, suitors are often put off by her highly scientific talks and unromantic soul. When out collecting specimens in the forest on one occasion, Rourou runs into her love interest's half-brother and is raped. She wakes up from the ordeal mentally traumatised.

The only son and baby of the family and also younger twin brother to Mo Rourou, Yangyang is agile and alert, Yangyang is quickly promoted in the Police Force. However, when his girlfriend runs into some problems with the law, he gets himself onto the wrong side of the law in a bid to cover up for her...

Main cast

Mo family
(in order of seniority)
Chen Liping as Mo Wanwan 莫婉婉
Patricia Mok as Mo Lingling 莫玲玲
Cynthia Koh as Mo Yanyan 莫燕燕
Jeanette Aw as Mo Jingjing 莫晶晶
Vivian Lai as Mo Rourou 莫柔柔
Pierre Png as Mo Yangyang 莫洋洋

Others
Xie Shaoguang as Yang Xiong 杨雄
Xiang Yun as Su Yueping 苏月萍
Huang Yiliang as Tian Dahua 田大华
Huang Wenyong as Lin Jingcai 林精采
Zheng Geping as Fang Nuowen 方诺文
Mark Lee as Su Hao 苏豪
Shaun Chen as Yu Hongzhi 余宏志
Jamie Yeo as Lin Siting 林丝婷
Yao Wenlong as Wu Ah Ming 吴亚明
Chen Tianwen as Gao Tianxiang 高天祥
Chen Guohua as Liang Ah Huo 梁阿火
Hu Wensui as Yang Zhe 杨哲
Le Yao as Yang Lin 杨琳
Jeff Wang as Edison Ying Tiancheng 应天承
Zhang Yaodong as Ying Tianyang 应天扬
Wendy Tseng as He Yujie 何雨洁
Ho Yeow Sun as Angel

2003 Accolades
At the Star Awards 2003, the show, at time on the ceremony, set a record for the most number of acting nominations awarded to a cast in a single year, with nine (four were in the Best Supporting Actor category, which was also a record). The drama also made notable history by becoming the first show to earn such distinction on winning all four major acting categories at the ceremony; at eight wins (five won during the main ceremony), it originally had the highest number of wins in a Star Awards ceremony until the 2009 ceremony, where it was first beaten by The Little Nyonyas nine wins (the current record holder as of 2016 was The Dream Makers II (another drama with a distinction of winning all four major acting categories), which won 12).

Additionally, at the Star Awards 25th Anniversary show (2007), Holland Vs theme song was voted as one of the top five favourites theme songs and the character of Mo Wanwan (portrayed by Chen Liping) was named one of the five most memorable characters. The show itself was honoured as one of the top five favourite dramas. The character of Edison Ying Tiancheng (portrayed by Jeff Wang) was named one of the Top 10 most memorable villains.

References

External links
 
 Holland V (English) on MediaCorp website
Holland V on Jeanette Aw fansite

2000s Singaporean television series
2003 Singaporean television series debuts
2003 Singaporean television series endings
Singapore Chinese dramas
Channel 8 (Singapore) original programming